Exercise Indradhanush (Hindi:Rainbow) is a joint air force exercise conducted by the Royal Air Force and the Indian Air Force. The exercise is tasked to enhance mutual operational understanding between the two air forces via close interaction. The exercise started in 2006 and has held four editions so far.

2006 
The first edition of the exercise was held between 2–13 October at Gwalior Air Force Station in India.

2007 
The second edition of the exercise was held at RAF Waddington in United Kingdom. India was represented by air superiority fighter Sukhoi Su-30MKI's and a mid-air refueling tanker Ilyushin IL-78 MKI from No. 78 Squadron. United Kingdom was represented by Panavia Tornado's from the No. 25 Squadron based at RAF Leeming and Eurofighter Typhoon's from No. 7 Squadron based at RAF Coningsby.

2010 
The third edition of the exercise was held between 18 October - 3 November at Kalaikunda AFS in India. India was represented by fighters Sukhoi Su-30 MKI's, Dassault Mirage 2000's, Mikoyan MiG-27's, a mid-air refueling tanker Ilyushin IL-78 MKI from No. 78 Squadron and an AWAC Beriev A-50 from No. 50 Squadron, both based at Agra AFS. United Kingdom was represented by Eurofighter Typhoon's.

2015 
The fourth edition of the exercise was held between 21–30 July at RAF Coningsby and RAF Brize Norton in United Kingdom. India was represented by four air superiority fighter Sukhoi Su-30 MKI's from No. 2 Squadron based at Tezpur AFS, one mid-air refueling tanker Ilyushin IL-78 MKI from No. 78 Squadron based at Agra AFS, a military transport aircraft Boeing C-17 Globemaster III from No. 81 Squadron based at Hindon AFS and Garud commandos. United Kingdom was represented by sixteen Eurofighter Typhoon's from No. 3 Squadron based at RAF Coningsby, an Airbus A330 MRTT air refueling tanker, a Lockheed Martin C-130J Hercules transport aircraft and RAF Regiment paratroopers. The fighter jets operated out of RAF Coningsby, the refueling tankers from RAF Brize Norton and the paratroopers from RAF Hunnington.  The exercise saw multiple engagements including 1vs1, 1vs2, 4vs4, beyond visual range (BVR), within visual range (WVR), paradropping mission between the two air forces. There was some controversy regarding the final tactical results of the exercise.

References 

Indian military exercises
Military aviation exercises